Here's Johnny may refer to:

 "Here's Johnny" (Hocus Pocus song), a 1993 song by Dutch dance music duo Hocus Pocus
 "Here's Johnny", the catchphrase used by Ed McMahon for almost 30 years on The Tonight Show Starring Johnny Carson (1962–1992)
 "Here's Johnny", catchphrase that was reused by Jack Nicholson in the 1980 film The Shining
 "Here's Johnny", a song referencing the McMahon catchphrase by "Weird Al" Yankovic on his 1986 Polka Party! album
 Here's Johnny, a 2000 documentary film about John Hicklenton

See also
Now Here's Johnny Cash (1961), the tenth album by Johnny Cash